Aadama Jaichomada is a 2014 Tamil language black comedy film directed by Badri. Produced by B&C films and Upshot Films, co-produced by Skilite Creations, the film stars Karunakaran, Bobby Simha and Vijayalakshmi in prominent roles, while Balaji Venugopal, Aadukalam Naren, K. S. Ravikumar amongst others appear in supporting roles. The dialogues were written by actor Shiva. The film deals with corruption involved in cricket. Aadama Jaichomada was released on 19 September 2014.

Title 
The film takes its name from a phrase in "Machi Open The Bottle", a song from the film Mankatha.

Plot 
The movie is about unraveling the identity of the mysterious 'Albert', who heads the spot fixing operations for the IPL Matches in Chennai. The Chennai Police Commissioner (K. S. Ravikumar) gets a tip off that Albert plans to fix a bowler to spot fix a specific over in the semifinal match of the IPL. He informs his officers to be sharp and on the lookout for 'Albert' or any clues leading to Albert. Dhayalan (Balaji Venugopal), Albert's agent, uses a taxi belonging to Panneer (Karunakaran) to travel all over Chennai, his motive being to confuse the police by constantly travelling and confusing the GPS locators. Dhayalan and Panneer bond and swap life stories. Panneer drops Dhayalan at his hotel and is asked to return the following morning. When Panneer goes to Dhayalan's room the following morning, he saw Dhayalan dead with a knife in his chest. This brings Inspector Bhoominathan (Bobby Simha) and his sidekick Constable Mariadas (Chetan), who arrest Panneer as a suspect for murdering Dhayalan. However, Panneer is whisked away by a film producer (Aadukalam Naren), who comes in the guise of a Maharashtra Police Officer. He wants Panneer, who is the last person to have seen Dhayalan alive, because he wants to place a bet on the match to win big and pay off a producer (Radha Ravi) to whom he owes several crores. Eventually, the police sets a trap for Albert with Panneer playing a major role, but the plot turns awry when Albert manages to get away with it and with Panneer winning two crores from his bet, which he uses to set up his own call taxi company, and his wife Rama (Vijayalakshmi), who sets up her own restaurant.

Cast

Karunakaran as Panneer
Bobby Simha as Inspector Bhoominathan
Vijayalakshmi as Rama
Balaji Venugopal as Dhayalan
K. S. Ravikumar as Police Commissioner
Aadukalam Naren as Film Producer
Radha Ravi as Producer
Chetan as Constable Mariadas
Gowtham Sundararajan as Naattamai
Abhishek Shankar as Santhilal Sait
Thalapathy Dinesh as Ravi
Vichu Viswanath
Vani Shetty as Reshma 
Mippu as Panneer's friend
 Sendrayan as hero of "Suravali" movie
Sai Priyanka Ruth as Receptionist

Soundtrack

The soundtrack for the film was composed by Sean Roldan. Aadama Jaichomada marked Sean's fourth film as a composer, followed by Vaayai Moodi Pesavum, Sathuranga Vettai and Mundasupatti, all of them were released in 2014. The five song soundtrack had lyrics penned by Pa. Vijay, GKB, Rajhesh Vaidhya and Sean himself as the lyricist. The audio launch event was held at Sathyam Cinemas in Chennai on 1 September 2014, where the makers unveiled the film's soundtrack and theatrical trailer of the film.
The soundtrack received positive reviews. Behindwoods gave a rating of 2.5 out of 5 to the album stating, "Sean Roldon continues his approach to bring new sounds to Tamil film songs. But Aadama Jaichomada songs will need the visuals to be evaluated better." Indiaglitz gave a rating of 3 out of 5 to the soundtrack.

Reception

Critical reception 
The film received overall positive reviews. The Times of India gave the film 2.5 stars out of 5 and wrote, "There is scope for an interesting black comedy in this plot but Aadama Jaichomada often feels less quirky and less funny than it should have been. It is as if the makers decided to stick to the lowest possible yardstick and were satisfied for managing to cross it. As a result, many of the jokes do not work that well...We are amused..we smile...we chuckle...but we never truly laugh non-stop". The New Indian Express wrote, "Laced with dark humour, Aadama Jaichomada keeps one entertained for the most part. Taking just about two hours of viewing time, Aadama Jaichomada has its good moments and is a breezy watch". Rediff gave 2.5 stars out of 5 and wrote, "The characters and the situation they unwittingly get themselves into, is well thought out, and cleverly woven into the screenplay. The narrative too is totally unpredictable, keeping you guessing. At just two hours, the story moves at a brisk pace", going on to add that the film "does work as an entertainer". Sify wrote, "The film works for its performances of Karunakaran, Balaji and the interactions between the bumbling cops Simhaa, KS Ravikumar and Chetan. There is something quirky about it that makes the film a watchable fun ride. Aadama Jaichomada is like a T:20 match fast and thoroughly enjoyable". IANS gave 3 stars and wrote, "Aadama Jaichomada, at two hours, attempts to be a crime-thriller as well as a sports-based comedy. But it only succeeds as the latter, and fails to do justice to the former form...Despite a weak story, the humour in Aadama Jaichomada will bowl over the movie buffs". The Hindu wrote, "Picture yourself reading an average joke book. You flip page after page, reading the jokes, many of which barely evoke a smile. Just as you decide to try one last one before flinging the book away, you find a tickler that gets you laughing. Aadama Jaichomada is this joke book that surprises you with a witty line or funny joke just when you are resigned to expecting nothing". Cinemalead rated a 2.5 out of 5 and wrote,"Short and Fun"

Box office
The film opened to good response and collected 4 crore (Share) in its first week end. The film collected 10.22 crore (Share) worldwide at the box office.

References

External links

Official website

2014 films
Indian films about gambling
2010s Tamil-language films
Films scored by Sean Roldan
Indian sports comedy films
2010s crime comedy films
2010s sports comedy films
Indian crime comedy films
2014 comedy films
Films directed by Badri